Jyothi Krishna (born 27 August 1992) is an Indian actress and classical dancer, working in the Malayalam film industry. She is also a Television host and RJ. She made her acting debut through the 2011 film Bombay March 12. Later she acted in God for Sale (2013),  Ranjith's Njaan (2014) and Jeethu Joseph's Life of Josutty (2015).

Filmography

TV

Television shows as Guest
 Get Set Chat (Kaumudy TV)
 Onnum Onnum Moonu (Mazhavil Manorama)
 Rhythm (Kairali TV)
 Grand Magical Circus (Amrita TV)
 Comedy Super Nite (Flowers Tv)
 Annies Kitchen (Amrita TV)
 I Personally (Kappa TV)

References

External links 
 

Actresses in Malayalam cinema
Indian film actresses
Living people
People from Thrissur district
21st-century Indian actresses
Indian women television presenters
Actresses in Malayalam television
1992 births
Actresses from Thrissur